Lamba is an uninhabited island in Yell Sound in Shetland. Its main features are a 27m high light marking the entrance to Sullom Voe, and an adjacent communications mast.

There are similarly named places, Lamba in the Faroe Islands and Lambay in Ireland.

Footnotes

Uninhabited islands of Shetland